Imphal West district (Meitei pronunciation:/ˈɪmfəl or ɪmˈfɑːl/) is one of the sixteen districts of Manipur state in northeastern India. As of 2011 it is the most populous district in the state.

Geography
Lamphelpat city is the administrative headquarters of the district. The district occupies an area of 519 km2.

Economy
The district ranks first on the basis of "District Infrastructure Index " calculated under the patronage of Department of Development of North Eastern Region.

Demographics
According to the 2011 census Imphal West district has a population of 517,992, roughly equal to the nation of Cape Verde. This gives it a ranking of 545th in India (out of a total of 640). Its population growth rate over the decade 2001-2011 was 15.82%. Imphal West has a sex ratio of 1029 females for every 1000 males, and a literacy rate of 86.7%. Scheduled Castes and Scheduled Tribes make up 3.19% and 4.66% of the population respectively.

Languages

As per 2011 census, the main languages spoken in Imphal West district are Manipuri (470,852), Kabui (10,408), Nepali (10,391), Hindi (5,248).

Administrative divisions

The district is divided into 4 sub-divisions and 10 Circles:
 Lamphelpat Sub-Division: Lamphelpat
 Patsoi Sub-Division: Patsoi, Konthoujam 
 Lamsang Sub-Division: Salam, Lamsang, Sekmai
 Wangoi Sub-Division: Hiyangthang, Lilong Chajing, Wangoi, Mayang Imphal

Areas under Imphal Urban Agglomeration
 Lamphelpat
 Patsoi
 Hiyangthang
 Lilong Chajing

See also 
 List of populated places in Imphal West district

References

External links
 Official district government website

 
Districts of Manipur